Laram Salla (Aymara larama blue, salla rocks, cliffs, "blue rocks", also spelled Laransalla) is a mountain in the western extensions of the Cordillera Real in the Andes of Bolivia which reaches a height of approximately . It is located in the La Paz Department, Los Andes Province, Batallas Municipality. Laram Salla lies southwest of Kimsa Chata and southeast of Qullqi Chata.

References 

Mountains of La Paz Department (Bolivia)